Max Volkhart (17 October 1848, Düsseldorf -  1924, Düsseldorf) was a German genre painter and etcher; associated with the Düsseldorfer Malerschule. He was heavily influenced by the Dutch Masters and many of his works are set in the 17th and 18th centuries.

Biography 
His father was the history painter , who was his first teacher. Later, he followed his father's example and enrolled at the Kunstakademie Düsseldorf, where he studied with Heinrich Lauenstein, Andreas Müller and Julius Roeting, whose daughter, Anna, he would later marry. Afterwards, he took private lessons from Eduard von Gebhardt. His first major painting, "The Wounded at Gravelotte" was inspired by the Franco-Prussian War and was later acquired by Kaiser Wilhelm I.

This period was followed by an extended trip to Belgium and the Netherlands, where he focused on studies from nature. In 1881 at Rotterdam, he presented a Panorama depicting the victory of Maurice, Prince of Orange over the Spaniards at the Battle of Nieuwpoort.

In 1883, he became a member of the "" (Rowing association), which had a boathouse in the harbor next to the Kunstakademie, and participated in numerous rowing competitions with some of his fellow artists.

He was also a member of "Malkasten", a progressive artists' association that grew out of the Revolution of 1848. He participated in many of their regular festivities, which included an annual masked ball, and directed their "Doppelhochzeitsfeier" (Double wedding) in 1898.

In his later years, he apparently faded into obscurity, as the exact date of his death seems to have been unrecorded and several sources give his year of death as 1935, rather than 1924.

Selected paintings

References 

 Hans Paffrath, Martina Sitt and Imke Valentien (eds.) Lexikon der Düsseldorfer Malerschule, Bruckmann, 1998 
 Biographical notes from Europas konstnärer @ Projekt Runeberg

External links 

ArtNet: More works by Volkhart.

1848 births
1924 deaths
19th-century German painters
19th-century German male artists
20th-century German painters
20th-century German male artists
German genre painters
Kunstakademie Düsseldorf alumni
History painters
Artists from Düsseldorf